Vox in excelso is the name of a bull issued by Pope Clement V in 1312. The directives given within the bull were to formally dissolve the Order of the Knights Templar, effectively removing papal support for them and revoking the mandates given to them by previous popes in the 12th and 13th centuries.

The issue of this bull followed a five-year period of suppression and trials of the Templars during which time they were accused of a variety of blasphemous and heretical crimes. However, the confessions were extracted with the use of torture and other methods developed by the Inquisition.

Other bulls involving Templars include Pastoralis Praeeminentiae and Ad providam.

See also
 List of papal bulls

References

Knights Templar
1312 works
14th-century papal bulls
Documents of Pope Clement V